Bidhannagar Road (Bengali: বিধাননগর রোড) is a  Kolkata Suburban Railway junction station on the Sealdah–Ranaghat line. It is linked to the Sealdah South lines via Sir Gurudas Banerjee Halt railway station. It is located in Ultadanga, Kolkata, West Bengal, India. It serves Ultadanga, Kankurgachi, Bidhannagar and other surrounding areas.

Naming 
Under the initiative of former West Bengal Chief Minister Dr. Bidhanchandra Roy, the town was built by pumping the alluvium containing the Ganges' saline water to fill the low-lying areas, hence the name was made 'Saline Lake' or 'Salt Lake'. In 1972, under the leadership of Indian Prime Minister Indira Gandhi, the Calcutta Session of the Indian National Congress was to be held in this 'Salt Lake'.

Congress delegates from all over India kept coming through Ultadanga station of Indian Railways. Incidentally, at that time, i.e. in 1972 AD, the name of 'Salt Lake' town was changed to 'Bidhanagar' and 'Ultadanga railway station' was renamed to 'Bidhanagar Road railway station'.

Design 
The station is rather uniquely designed. Platform no. 2 and 3 share the same island platform. However, the platform is very long (double the length of a normal platform) and is half the width of an island platform serving trains of both sides. The southern half of the platform is used as platform 2 and the northern half is used as platform 3. The section of track which is not being used by the platforms has been fenced to provide safety from the accelerating trains.

History

The Sealdah–Kusthia line of Eastern Bengal Railway was opened to traffic in 1862. Eastern Bengal Railway worked on the eastern side of the Hooghly River.

Electrification
The Sealdah–Ranaghat sector was electrified in 1963–64.

Handling Capacity
Bidhannagar Road railway station handles 975,000 passengers every day, with about 325 trains in both directions.

Connections

Bus 
Bus route number 12C/2, 30C/1, 32A, 43/1, 44, 44A, 45, 46, 46A, 46B, 47/1, 79D, 91C, 201, 206, 211, 211B, 215, 215A, 215A/1, 217, 217A, 217B, 221, 223, 237, L238, 253, 260, DN8, DN16/1, DN17, KB16, KB17, KB21, KB22, JM2, JM4, 007, K1, 5 (Mini), 20 (Mini), 20A (Mini), 29 (Mini), S138 (Mini), S151 (Mini), S152 (Mini), S171 (Mini), S172 (Mini), S175 (Mini), S184 (Mini), C14/1, C41, C42, C48, D7/1, D11A, D20, D22, E17, E25, E25A, E36, E39, E46, E47, MX1, MX3, S12C, S14C, S16, S19, S21, S30A, S30D, S37, S37A, S58, T11, 15, AC2, AC10, AC30, AC30S, AC35, AC37, AC37C, AC39, AC49A, AC50, AC50A, ACT5, ACT7, ACT9, M4, M10, MN5, MN10, MN20, MW7, V1, VS1, VS2, VS14, ST7, ST15, ST21 serve the station.

Metro 
Shyambazar metro station, Shobhabazar Sutanuti metro station, Bengal Chemical metro station and Phoolbagan metro station are located nearby.

Tram 
Tram route number 18 serves the station.

Air 
Netaji Subhas Chandra Bose International Airport is about 9 km at the distance via VIP Road.

See also 

 Dum Dum Junction railway station
 Sealdah railway station
 Belgharia railway station

References

External links
 Long distance trains at Bidhannagar Road
 

Sealdah railway division
Railway stations in North 24 Parganas district
Kolkata Suburban Railway stations
Kolkata Circular Railway